Luise Keller (born 8 March 1984) is a road cyclist from Germany. She represented her nation at the 2005, 2007, 2008, and 2010 UCI Road World Championships.

See also
 2006 Buitenpoort–Flexpoint Team season
 2009 Team Columbia–HTC Women season 
 2010 Team HTC–Columbia Women season

References

External links
 

1984 births
German female cyclists
Living people
Place of birth missing (living people)
Sportspeople from Jena
Cyclists from Thuringia
People from Bezirk Gera
21st-century German women